The Polish Football League (shortly PFL) is an American football league in Poland. Founded in 2021 after merge of the Topliga and the LFA which have been split in 2017. The league is played under the newly formed Polish football association Związek Futbolu Amerykańskiego w Polsce (ZFAP). The championship game of the league is the Polish Bowl. The inaugural season was held with 7 teams in PFL Division 1 and in 7 teams in PFL Division 2.

History
After the 2017 PLFA season, there was a split in the Polish American Football Association. 20 teams among them 5 from the TopLiga left the Polish American Football League and founded a new league LFA.

Teams 2023

PLF 1
Kraków Kings
Lowlanders Białystok
Silesia Rebels
Tychy Falcons
Warsaw Eagles
Warsaw Mets
Jaguars Kąty Wrocławskie
Olsztyn Lakers

References

External links
 
 

 

American football leagues in Europe